James Hilton (1884–1943) was an English professional rugby league footballer who played in the 1900s and 1910s.

Background
Jimmy Hilton was born in Leigh, Lancashire, England, he was an iron mouldmaker, and he died aged  in Leigh, Lancashire, England.

Playing career

International honours
Jimmy Hilton won caps for England while at Halifax in 1908 against Wales, and in 1912 against Wales.

International honours
Jimmy Hilton won caps for Yorkshire while at Halifax.

Club career
Jimmy Hilton made his début for Halifax on Saturday 28 January 1905, and he played his last match for Halifax in the 5-8 defeat by Dewsbury in the 1912 Challenge Cup semi-final during the 1911–12 season on Saturday 13 April 1912, he was transferred to Wigan for £175 (based on inflation ) (based on increases in average earnings approximately equivalent to £63,600 in 2016). he made his début for Wigan in 70-0 victory over Coventry RLFC at Central Park, Wigan on Wednesday 20 November 1912, and he played his last match for Wigan in the 2-14 defeat by Widnes at Lowerhouse Lane, Widnes on Saturday 22 March 1913.

References

1880s births
1943 deaths
England national rugby league team players
English rugby league players
Halifax R.L.F.C. players
Keighley Cougars players
Leigh Leopards players
Rugby league five-eighths
Rugby league halfbacks
Rugby league players from Leigh, Greater Manchester
Wigan Warriors players
Yorkshire rugby league team players